Sigurd Forchhammer (18 April 1906 – 12 March 1981) was a Danish sculptor. His work was part of the sculpture event in the art competition at the 1932 Summer Olympics.

References

1906 births
1981 deaths
20th-century Danish sculptors
20th-century male artists
Olympic competitors in art competitions
People from Neu-Isenburg